Salvianus is a genus of shield bugs in the subfamily Phyllocephalinae and the tribe Phyllocephalini, erected by Distant in 1902.

References

External links
 

Pentatomidae
Pentatomidae genera